Emilio Álvarez Blanco (born 19 October 1971), is a retired Spanish footballer who played as a goalkeeper. He used to serve as a goalkeeping coach for English side Manchester United.

Career statistics

Club

Notes

References

1971 births
Living people
Spanish footballers
Association football goalkeepers
Real Madrid CF players
Rayo Vallecano players
CF Palencia footballers
Extremadura UD footballers
Recreativo de Huelva players
Elche CF players
Algeciras CF footballers
CD Mensajero players
Segunda División B players
Segunda División players
Expatriate sports coaches